Stephen Kwabena Opuni is a Ghanaian health practitioner and a former chief executive officer of the Ghana Cocoa Board.

Early life and education 
Stephen Kwabena Opuni was born at Sunyani, the capital of the Brong Ahafo Region, Ghana. His mother was from, Dormaa Babianeha, near Dormaa Ahenkro in the Brong Ahafo Region. His father, Nicholas Hayford Kwabena Opuni, was the Brong Ahafo Regional Secretary of Kwame Nkrumah's Convention People's Party (CPP) in 1966

Alleged corruption scandal   
Opuni was alleged to have been involved a in number of corruption charges including causing financial loss to Ghana. Attorney-General of Ghana, Gloria Akuffo stated that the former COCOBOD CEO Dr. Stephen Opuni may face a 25 years sentence if found guilty.

Accusations 
He was accused with 27 charges for causing financial loss to the state. Some of the charges include; money laundering, violation of procurement laws and defrauding by false pretenses. The state says it has established that Seidu Agongo deposited an amount of 25,000 cedes into the account of Stephen Kwabena Opuni to influence the award of contracts.

References 

Living people
Year of birth missing (living people)